Herbert Binkert (3 September 1923 – 4 January 2020) was a German footballer who played internationally for Saarland.

Club career 
With 1. FC Saarbrücken the striker took part in the 1955–56 European Cup.

International career 
Binkert scored six goals in twelve international matches for the Saarland.

References

External links
 
 

1923 births
2020 deaths
Footballers from Karlsruhe
Association football forwards
Saar footballers
Saarland international footballers
VfB Stuttgart players
1. FC Saarbrücken players
German football managers
West German football managers
SV Röchling Völklingen managers
FC 08 Homburg managers
1. FC Saarbrücken managers
Recipients of the Saarland Order of Merit
20th-century German people